Statue of Daniel Webster may refer to:

 Statue of Daniel Webster (Boston), Massachusetts, U.S.
 Statue of Daniel Webster (New York City), New York, U.S.
 Statue of Daniel Webster (U.S. Capitol), Washington, D.C., U.S.

See also
 Daniel Webster Memorial